Metrocles is a genus of skippers in the family Hesperiidae.

Species
Recognised species in the genus Metrocles include:
 Metrocles argentea (Weeks, 1901)
 Metrocles briquenydan (Weeks, 1901) 
 Metrocles devergens (Draudt, 1923) 
 Metrocles hyboma (Plötz, 1886) 
 Metrocles leucogaster  Godman, 1900
 Metrocles propertius Fabricius, 1793
 Metrocles santarus (Bell, 1940) 
 Metrocles schrottkyi (Giacomelli, 1911)
 Metrocles scitula (Hayward, 1951)
 Metrocles zisa (Plötz, 1882)

References 

Natural History Museum Lepidoptera genus database

Hesperiidae genera